The following is a list of paintings by the Dutch Golden Age painter Johannes Vermeer (1632–1675). After two or three early history paintings, he concentrated almost entirely on genre works, typically interiors with one or two figures. His popularity is due less to his subject matter than to the poetic manner in which he portrays his subjects and that he lived a very difficult life. Vermeer's paintings of the 1660s are generally more popular than his work from the 1670s: in the eyes of some, his later work is colder.

Today, 34 paintings are firmly attributed to him, with question marks over a further three. This compares to the 74 pictures attributed to him by Théophile Thoré-Bürger in 1866. Vermeer's reputation increased greatly during the latter half of the 20th century, a period during which the number of paintings ascribed to him shrank greatly. This is partly because he has been one of the most widely forged artists, and many forgeries have now been identified. No drawings or preparatory paintings are known. Many Vermeer paintings are known by various names, and alternative names are noted below. Years of creation are only estimates for most of the paintings, and sources often give different, though not widely divergent, estimates. In addition to the known paintings listed below, historical documents seem to describe at least six other, lost, works.

Paintings by Johannes Vermeer

Disputed paintings

Lost works
Historical documents such as auction records suggest that Vermeer painted a number of other works, now presumably destroyed, lost to public view, or possibly wrongly attributed to other artists. While a list of these lost Vermeers must necessarily be tentative, it may include:

 a self-portrait
 a painting of a man washing his hands
 a second street scene (the first being The Little Street)
 a Visit to the Tomb – possibly Biblical
 a mythological painting including Jupiter
 a relatively early painting described as a 'face by Vermeer'

Footnotes

Sources
Bonafoux, Pascal. Vermeer. New York: Konecky & Konecky, 1992. 
Cant, Serena. Vermeer and His World 1632–1675, Quercus Publishing Plc, 2009. 
Wheelock, Arthur K. Vermeer: The Complete Works. New York: Harry N. Abrams, 1997. 

Vermeer